Avi Shmailov (Hebrew: אבי שמיילוב) is an Israeli trance music DJ and producer, his stage name is Astrix. His specialty is in subgenre of progressive psychedelic trance.

In 2006 Astrix made it to #41 in DJMag's "Top 100 DJs" yearly rank, alongside several of other Israeli musicians (the highest being Infected Mushroom at #9), In 2007, Astrix reached #18 on the list, marking a significant proportion of the Israeli electronic music scene.

Early career
Astrix was born in Georgia in the then USSR, to a Mountain Jewish family in the Caucasus and grew up in Tel Aviv, Israel. He began recording music under the name Astrix in 1997, sometimes misconceived to be taken from the Asterix comic books. An interview on UK clubbing website Harderfaster.net revealed the name was chosen for simply sounding good, and not directly influenced by anything in particular.

1995–2002
Astrix started as a DJ in 1995 playing alternative and 1980s music. It was during this time that he learned about electronic music. In 1997 he began his first in-house studio recordings using a personal computer. He discovered trance in 1997 after being invited to a trance party. "At first it was a very new and strange experience for me and I couldn't find myself, but I was impressed by the energy and the impact that the music had made on the people at the party." At the beginning of his career in the late 1990s he produced tracks in the "nitzhonot" style of trance, an anthemic offshoot of Goa trance. His first tracks were "In Peace" and "Eakhis World," which both appeared on the nitzhonot compilation Ptzatzot 3.

2002–2010
In 2002, Astrix signed to the EDM label HOM-Mega productions with his debut album Eye to Eye. In a 2003 interview Astrix said that he worked on three albums by Alien Project, but its maintainer Ari Linker did not give him credit. Touring after the Eye to Eye album release and working on other projects did not leave much studio time for Astrix and it took two years to write his second album, Artcore, which came out in 2004. He also produced the albums Nu-clear Visions of Israel (TIP.World, 2003), Psychedelic Academy (Hit Mania, 2005) and Astrix & Friends (DJ mag, 2007). In 2009, Astrix's label, HOM-Mega Productions, was the first to release a digital album from Astrix on a USB flash drive, One Step Ahead (HOM-Mega Productions, 2009). Astrix then undertook an almost nonstop worldwide tour.

Festivals included Dance Valley, SW4, Creamfields, Love Parade, UAF, Planeta Atlantida and headlined nights in the best clubs and venues such as Alexandra Palace, Brixton Academy, Pacha, Ministry of Sound, The City, Volume and Nox.

2010–present

Over the last couple of years, studio time was a rare commodity for Astrix, but nevertheless he managed to find the extra hours to work on his third studio album for HOM-Mega productions. Red Means Distortion is the result of some very late night sessions.

The Acid Rocker EP, which was released in August 2010, was the first release from the next studio album, Red Means Distortion. As bonus material, it included a remix by trance artist Pixel of  "Closer to Heaven" featured vocalist Michele Adamson, and a fresh new GMS 2010 remix to Astrix's  "Eye to Eye". In September, a month after the Acid rocker EP was released, the third album Red means distortion was released. Starting in August 2010, Astrix has been creating mix sessions titled Trance for Nations.

Musical style
Astrix says his music has solid, driving basslines and ascending melodies.
Many would consider his style to be a crossover between "full-on" and the "clubbier" end of Trance, exemplified by his Psychedelic Academy Mix.

Author Graham St John, of the book The Local Scenes and Global Culture of Psytrance, noted about Astrix's sound, "crisp spacious acoustics".

Influences
Astrix has been cited as being musically influenced by Infected Mushroom. "I look up to them for inspiration and for some kind of spiritual fuel as it were." Other influences include Linkin Park and Paul Van Dyk. "I also have a love for alternative bands like Linkin Park, and as electronic producer I like Paul Van Dyk, he inspires me very much to see how well you can mix business with music and how big you can become from something that was so small in the beginning."

Discography

Albums 

 Eye to Eye (2002)
 Artcore (2004)
 One Step Ahead (2008)
 Red Means Distortion (2010)
 He.art (2016)

EPs / Singles 
 Coolio, 2004, HOM-Mega Productions
 Coolio (12"), 2004, Tokyo Dance
 Closer to Heaven (12"), 2005, Tokyo Dance
 Future Music EP, 2007, Spiral Trax
 Acid Rocker EP, 2010, HOMmega HD
 Reunion, 2011, Plastik Park
 Type 1, 2012, HOMmega HD
 Stars on 35, 2012, HOMmega HD
 High on Mel, 2013, HOMmega HD

Appearances

DVD videos  
 The Gathering, 2002 - 2007, Vision Quest Productions
 X-Mode Vol. 6 Back to the Future, 2004, Tokyo X-Ray Studios Productions
 Supervision - NTSC/PAL, 2006, Tip.World Productions
 Boom Festival 2008 - We Are All - NTSC/PAL, 2009, GoodMood Productions
 The Beach 2009, FinePlay Records Productions

References

1981 births
Living people
Goa trance musicians
Israeli psychedelic trance musicians
Tracker musicians
Israeli electronic musicians
Israeli people of Mountain Jewish descent